The first chiefs of the Scottish Highland, Clan Ross were also the original Earls of Ross. That title later went to other families in the late 14th century and from then on the chiefs of Clan Ross were designated as "of Balnagowan". This was because their seat was at Balnagowen Castle. The chiefship of the clan has since passed to various branches of the clan. The current chief is David Campbell Ross who descends from Hugh Ross the 4th of Balnagowan. The following is a list of the chiefs of Clan Ross.

References

The Clan Ross by Donald by Donald MacKinnon. W & A.K Johnston's Clan Histories.

External links
Clan Ross of the United States
Clan Ross Association of Canada
Clan Ross Association of the Netherlands

Ross
Chiefs of Clan Ross